Beneath the Skin may refer to:

Beneath the Skin (Collide album)
Beneath the Skin (Of Monsters and Men album)
Beneath the Skin – Live in Paris, a 2001 concert video by the Cranberries